Michael or Mike Hunter may refer to:

 Michael Hunter (historian) (born 1949), professor of history at Birkbeck, University of London
 Michael Hunter (composer), Scottish composer of sounds for Grand Theft Auto
 Michael Wayne Hunter (born 1958), San Quentin prisoner/writer
 Michael Hunter (boxer) (born 1978), English bantamweight
 Michael Hunter (politician) (1891–1951), Member of Parliament for Brigg, 1931–1935
 Mike Hunter (boxer) (1959–2006), American clubfighter
 Michael Hunter (American boxer) (born 1988), his son, American superheavyweight champ 2007
 Mike Hunter (politician) (born 1947), Canadian politician
 Mike Hunter (footballer) (born 1948), English football forward with Darlington and in Ireland with Sligo Rovers
 Mike Hunter (soccer) (born 1958), retired U.S. soccer defender
 Michael J. Hunter (born 1956), Oklahoma politician
 Michael Hunter (American football) (born 1993), American football player
 Michael Hunter (forensic pathologist), forensic pathologist and host of TV series Autopsy: The Last Hours of...
 Michael Hunter (rugby union), Scottis rugby union player